Saimaa University of Applied Sciences was a university of applied sciences in the region of South Karelia, Finland.

Before 2009, it was known as South Karelia University of Applied Sciences. Its campuses located in Lappeenranta. Saimaa University of Applied Sciences had had campus in Imatra, but it closed, and all the functions were moved to Lappeenranta.

In January 2020, Lahti University of Applied Sciences and Saimaa University of Applied Sciences merged, establishing the new LAB University of Applied Sciences.

References

External links

Universities and colleges in Finland
Defunct schools in Finland
Educational institutions disestablished in 2020
Lappeenranta